The 1967–68 ABA season was the inaugural season of the American Basketball Association and the Denver Rockets. This was the first professional basketball played in Denver since the original Denver Nuggets disbanded in 1950. They finished 45-33, which was good enough to qualify for a playoff spot, as the third team out of four. They lost in the first round. This was their first of three consecutive playoff appearances, and first of ten appearances in the franchise's first twelve years.

Roster

Season standings

Eastern Division

Western Division

Record vs. opponents

Playoffs
Western Division Semifinals

Rockets lose 3-2

Game log
 1967-68 Denver Rockets Schedule and Results | Basketball-Reference.com

Statistics

Awards and records
 ABA All-Star: Larry Jones
 ABA All-League Team

Transactions

References

Denver Nuggets seasons
Denver
Denver
Denver